Rajdhani Unnayan Kartripakkha (abbreviated as RAJUK; literally the Capital Development Authority of the Government of Bangladesh) is a Bangladeshi public agency responsible for coordinating urban development in Dhaka, Bangladesh. RAJUK is composed of various public officials, city planners, urban administrators, engineers, and architects.

It is the National Authoritative Board on building planning, estates and resources, plot allotment, and construction approvals from both public and private entities. It utilizes the Dhaka Improvement Trust (Allotment of Land) Rule of 1969 and The Town Improvement Act of 1953, both scribed since before the Independence of Bangladesh.

RAJUK projects 
 Uttara Apartment Project 
 Purbachal New Town
 Jhilmil Residential Project
 Urban Resilience Project

Activities
It carries out drives against building code violations in Dhaka City. This is challenging as policing of illegal development is limited. The agency is supposed to generate revenue from city land, which many feel conflicts with its strategic and planning functions.

References

 
Government agencies of Bangladesh
1956 establishments in East Pakistan
1987 establishments in Bangladesh
Organisations based in Dhaka
Government of Dhaka